Auricular appendage can refer to:
 Left atrial appendage
 Right atrial appendage